Nathan Haines Mannakee (February 14, 1879 – July 9, 1965) was an American college football head coach who was Delaware football program's fourth head coach. He led them to an 8–13–2 overall record between 1903 and 1905. He married Sarah Nelson Dale.

Head coaching record

References

External links
 

1879 births
1965 deaths
Delaware Fightin' Blue Hens football coaches
Swarthmore College alumni
Sportspeople from Baltimore